Chubb may refer to:

People
 Chubb (surname), a list of people with the surname
 Timothy O'Connor (Irish politician) (1906–1986), Irish politician nicknamed "Chubb"
 Chubb Rock, American rapper Richard Simpson (born 1968)

Other uses
 Chubb Limited, an American insurance company
 Chubb Locks, a British lock and security company
 Chubb Fire & Security, a British firm specialised in fire protection and security
 Chubb Crater, a meteor crater in Quebec
 Chubb, alternative spelling for Squalius cephalus, also known as chub, a European river fish
 HMS Chubb, new name of  after her capture by the British in 1812

See also
Chubb illusion, an optical illusion dealing with visual perception
Chub (disambiguation)
Chubbtown, Georgia

Lists of people by nickname